This article lists notable families whose members are prominent in the Indian Film Industry. For South Indian film families, see List of South Indian film families and for Indian music families, see List of Indian music families.

A

Akhtar–Azmi– Kher  family
The Akhtar family is a prominent film family in the Hindi film Industry. It consists of poets, authors, scriptwriters, directors, actors, and producers. Poet, author, philosopher and one of the main members in the Indian Rebellion of 1857, The great great grandfather of Indian Urdu poet, was the grandson and grandfather of Javed Akhtar. Lyricist Javed Akhtar married the script writer Honey Irani. His second wife is actress Shabana Azmi. Azmi's nieces are actresses Farah Naaz, Mayyesha Hashmi and Tabu. Farhan and Zoya Akhtar's cousins are Anya Prakash, Farah Khan, and Sajid Khan.

Akkineni Prasad (L. V. Prasad) family
 Akkineni Lakshmi Vara Prasada Rao (Telugu and Hindi film producer, and Prasad's Group founder)
 Akkineni Ramesh Prasad son of L. V. Prasad, and owner of Prasads Group
 A. Sreekar Prasad (Malayalam, Tamil, Telugu and Hindi film editor, son of Akkineni Sanjeevi)

Akkineni–Daggubati family

The Akkineni–Daggubati family is a prominent film family with a long history in Indian cinema mainly Telugu and Hindi cinema. Akkineni Nageswara Rao and Daggubati Ramanaidu are the prominent heads of both families.
 Akkineni Nageswara Rao
 Nagarjuna (younger son of ANR)
 Akkineni Naga Chaitanya (son of Nagarjuna and Daggubati Lakshmi)

 Amala (second wife of Nagarjuna)
 Akhil Akkineni (son of Nagarjuna and Amala)
 Sumanth (nephew of Nagarjuna)
 Sushanth (nephew of Nagarjuna)
A. V. Subba Rao (paternal grandfather of Sushanth, Noted Film Producer)
 Daggubati Ramanaidu (producer, former MP, father of Venkatesh and grandfather of Rana Daggubati)
 Daggubati Suresh Babu (producer, elder son of Ramanaidu and father of Rana Daggubati)
 Daggubati Rana (actor and grandson of Ramanaidu)
 Daggubati Venkatesh (actor, younger son of Ramanaidu and uncle of Rana Daggubati)

Ali–Amrohi family
 Mumtaz Ali (actor, dancer)
 Mehmood Ali (actor, comedian, son of Mumtaz Ali)
 Lucky Ali (singer, actor, second son of Mehmood Ali and Madhu)
 Pucky Ali (actor and eldest son of Mehmood and Madhu)
 Macky Ali (actor and third son of Mehmood and Madhu)
 Minoo Mumtaz (actress, dancer, daughter of Mumtaz Ali)
 Anwar Ali (actor, son of Mumtaz Ali)
 Khursheed Jr. (actress, elder sister of Meena Kumari)
 Meena Kumari (actress, ex-sister-in-law of Mehmood Ali and sister of Mehmood Ali's ex-wife)
 Kamal Amrohi (director, husband of Meena Kumari)
 Bilal Amrohi (actor, grandson of Kamal Amrohi)
 Mashhoor Amrohi (actor, grandson of Kamal Amrohi)
 Mazhar Khan (actor and maternal uncle to Bilal and Mashhoor Amrohi)
 Zeenat Aman (actress, wife of Mazhar Khan)

Allu family 
Allu Ramalingaiah was a renowned Telugu comedic actor and a recipient of the Padma Shri. His son, Allu Aravind, is one of the most powerful producers in Tollywood, and one of his sisters, Surekha, is married to actor Megastar Chiranjeevi. His grandsons by Aravind, Allu Arjun and Allu Sirish, are both actors.
 Allu Ramalingaiah (1 October 1922 – 30 July 2004) – veteran actor, comedian, and producer
 Allu Aravind (producer, distributor) – son of Allu Ramalingaiah and brother-in-law of Chiranjeevi
 Allu Arjun (actor – son of Allu Aravind)
 Allu Sirish (actor, producer – son of Allu Aravind)

Anand–Sahni family
The most prominent member of the Anand family was actor Dev Anand, who has starred in over a hundred films. Another member of the family is internationally known director Shekhar Kapur, who is known for directing the film Elizabeth. He was married to actress Suchitra Krishnamurthy.
 Dev Anand
 Kalpana Kartik (wife of Dev Anand)
 Suneil Anand (son of Dev Anand)
 Chetan Anand (elder brother of Dev Anand)
 Uma Anand (wife of Chetan Anand)
 Ketan Anand (son of Chetan Anand)
 Priya Rajvansh (actress and partner of Chetan Anand)
 Kamaljeet (actor and brother of Priya Rajvansh)
 Vijay Anand (younger brother of Dev Anand)
Sheel Kanta Kapoor (mother of Shekhar Kapoor and sister of Dev Anand)
 Shekhar Kapur (nephew of Dev Anand, son of Sheel Kanta Kapur)
 Suchitra Krishnamurthy (ex-wife of Shekhar Kapur)
 Kaveri Kapur (daughter of Shekhar Kapur and Suchitra Krishnamurthy)
 Sohaila Kapur (niece of Dev Anand, daughter of Sheel Kanta Kapur) 
 Navin Nischol (actor, former brother-in-law of Shekhar Kapur)
 Balraj Sahni (actor)
 Bhisham Sahni (playwright, actor, novelist and brother of Balraj Sahni)
 Parikshit Sahni (actor, son of Balraj Sahni and brother-in-law of Shekhar Kapur)
 Vishal Anand (nephew of Dev Anand)
 Purab Kohli (nephew of Vishal Anand)
 Aalim Rushdy Anand (Independent Filmmaker)

Anant Nag
Anant Nag actor, writer, producer 
Gayatri actress and producer (wife of Anant Nag)
Shankar Nag actor, director and producer (younger brother of Anant Nag)
Arundathi Nag actress, director and producer (wife of Shankar Nag)

B

Babbar family

Raj Babbar is an Indian actor and politician. His first wife was Nadira Babbar, who became known with her appearance in Bride and Prejudice (2004) with Aishwarya Rai. Their children are Arya Babbar and Juhi Babbar. Both have ventured into the film industry. Raj's second wife was actress Smita Patil. She died giving birth to their only child Prateek Babbar in 1986. Her son Prateek made his acting debut in 2008 film Jaane Tu Ya Jaane Na. Raj Babbar's niece Kajri Babbar is a budding director.
 Syed Sajjad Zaheer
 Nadira Babbar (first wife of Raj Babbar and daughter of Syed Sajjad Zaheer)
 Arya Babbar (son of Raj Babbar and Nadira Babbar)
 Juhi Babbar (daughter of Raj Babbar and Nadira Babbar)
 Anup Soni (husband of Juhi Babbar)
 Shivajirao Girdhar Patil
 Smita Patil (second wife of Raj and daughter of Shivajirao Patil)
 Prateek Babbar (son of Smita Patil and Raj Babbar)
 Raj Babbar
 Kishan Babbar - brother of Raj Babbar, film producer and father of Kajri Babbar

Bachchan family 

 Harivansh Rai Bachchan (poet – married to social activist Teji Bachchan, mother of Amitabh Bachchan)
 Amitabh Bachchan (actor – married to Jaya Bachchan, son of Harivansh Rai Bachchan, father of Abhishek Bachchan, father of Shweta Bachchan-Nanda)
 Jaya Bachchan (actress – married to Amitabh Bachchan, mother of Abhishek Bachchan)
 Abhishek Bachchan (actor – married to Aishwarya Rai Bachchan, son of Amitabh Bachchan and Jaya Bachchan)
 Aishwarya Rai Bachchan (actress – married to Abhishek Bachchan)
Shweta Bachchan Nanda – (married to Nikhil Nanda)
Agastya Nanda (actor - debuting in The Archies, son of Shweta Bachchan Nanda and Nikhil Nanda)
Navya Naveli Nanda (entrepreneur, cofounder of Aara Health and Project Naveli)
 Ajitabh Bachchan (actor and producer – son of Harivansh Rai Bachchan, brother of Amitabh Bachchan)
 Kunal Kapoor (actor, married to Ajitabh Bachchan's daughter Naina Bachchan)
 Tillotama Shome (actress – married to Jaya Bachchan's sister's son)

Barjatya family

The Barjatya family began with Tarachand Barjatya, who was a film producer and director. He began Rajshri Productions in the late 1940s. Tarachand Barjatya had three sons, Kamal Kumar Barjatya, Raj Kumar Barjatya, and Ajit Kumar Barjatya, all of whom were active in bringing the Rajshri empire to great heights. The company saw an all time increase in revenues when Raj Kumar Barjatya's son, Sooraj R. Barjatya, started his film making career with the 1989 blockbuster, Maine Pyar Kiya and then eventually made Hum Aapke Hain Koun and Hum Saath Saath Hain. The company is now led by the third generation of Barjatyas, namely, Kavita K. Barjatya, Sooraj R. Barjatya and Rajat A. Barjatya.
 Tarachand Barjatya (director, producer, writer and founder of Rajshri Productions)
 Kavita K. Barjatya (producer – daughter of Kamal Kumar Barjatya)
 Sooraj R. Barjatya (director, producer and writer – son of Raj Kumar Barjatya)

Baweja family

 Harry Baweja (Director and producer)
 Pammi Baweja (wife of Harry Baweja)
 Harman Baweja (Actor, Elder son of Harry and Pammi Baweja)

Bedi family (of Kabir Bedi)

 Kabir Bedi (actor)
 Protima Bedi (Odissi dancer – wife of Kabir Bedi)
 Pooja Bedi (actor and model – daughter of Kabir and Protima)
 Alaya Furniturewala (daughter of Pooja Bedi)

Bedi family (of Bishan Bedi)

 Bishan Singh Bedi (former Indian cricketer)
 Angad Bedi (model and actor – son of Bishan Singh Bedi)
 Neha Dhupia (model and actor – wife of Angad Bedi)

Bedi family (of Rajinder Singh Bedi)
 Rajinder Singh Bedi (writer and director)
 Narendra Bedi (director, writer, producer - son of Rajinder Singh Bedi)
 Manek Bedi (actor and producer - son of Narendra Bedi)
 Rajat Bedi (actor, entrepreneur and producer - son of Narendra Bedi)
 Tulip Joshi (actress - sister-in-law of Rajat Bedi)

Behl family 

 Ramesh Behl (nephew of Shukla Behl and Rajendra Kumar. Cousin of Kumar Gaurav), producer
 Goldie Behl (son of Ramesh Behl and husband of actress Sonali Bendre), producer

Bhatt family (of Nanabhai Bhatt)

Bhatt family (of Vijay Bhatt)

 Vijay Bhatt (producer, director and screenwriter)
 Pravin Bhatt (cinematographer and director, son of Vijay Bhatt)
 Vikram Bhatt (director and producer, son of Pravin Bhatt)
 Arun Bhatt (director, son of Vijay Bhatt)
 Chirantan Bhatt (musician and singer, son of Arun Bhatt)

Bhattacharya family

 Pashupati Bhattacharjee (vocalist and composer)
 Kumar Sanu a.k.a. Kedarnath Bhattacharjee (playback singer, producer and music director – son of Pashupati Bhattacharya)

Bohra family

 Shree Ram Bohra (producer – brother of Ramkumar Bohra)
 Sunil Bohra (producer – grandson of Shree Ram Bohra)
 Ramkumar Bohra (producer, director – brother of Shree Ram Bohra)
 Mahendra Bohra (producer, director – son of Ramkumar Bohra)
 Karanvir Bohra (actor, designer, producer – son of Mahendra Bohra)

Bokadia family 

 K.C. Bokadia (Indian filmmaker)
  Pramod Bokadia (son of K.C. Bokadia), producer.
 Rajesh Bokadia (son of K.C. Bokadia), producer.

C

Chandrasekhar family

 S. A. Chandrasekhar (director)
 Shoba Chandrasekhar (director and playback singer – wife of Chandrasekhar)
 Joseph Vijay Chandrasekhar (actor, son of Chandrasekhar and Shoba)
 S. N. Surendar (playback singer, brother of Shoba)
 Hari Prashanth (actor, son of S. N. Surendar)
 Vikranth (actor, nephew of S. A. Chandrasekhar)

Chakraborty family

 Mithun Chakraborty (actor, hotelier and producer)
 Yogeeta Bali (actress and producer – wife of Mithun Chakraborty)
 Mahaakshay Chakraborty (actor – son of Mithun Chakraborty and Yogeeta Bali)
 Madalsa Sharma Chakraborty (actress — wife of Mahaakshay Chakraborty), daughter of Sheela Sharma
 Ushmey Chakraborty (actor – son of Mithun Chakraborty and Yogeeta Bali)
 Geeta Bali (actress – aunt of Yogeeta)
 Aditya Raj Kapoor (actor, businessman and filmmaker – cousin of Yogeeta and son of Shammi Kapoor, member of Kapoor family)

Chatterjee family
 Biswajit Chatterjee (actor)
 Prosenjit Chatterjee (actor – son of Biswajeet Chatterjee)
 Debashree Roy (politician, actress– ex-wife of Prosenjeet Chatterjee)
 Arpita Pal (actress – wife of Prosenjeet Chatterjee
 Pallavi Chatterjee (actress – daughter of Biswajeet Chatterjee)

Konidela family 

Konidela Siva Sankara Vara Prasad, known by his stage name Chiranjeevi, is one of the most prominent Telugu actors of all time. He introduced his brothers, Nagendra Babu and Pawan Kalyan, as well as his son, Ram Charan, to Tollywood and is the head of his family. 
 Chiranjeevi (actor, producer and former Minister of Tourism)
Ram Charan (actor, producer – son of Chiranjeevi)
Allu Arjun (actor, son of Allu Aravind)
Allu Sirish (actor, son of Allu Aravind)
Allu Aravind (producer, distributor) – son of Allu Ramalingaiah and brother-in-law of Chiranjeevi (see Allu family)
 Sai Dharam Tej (actor – son of Vijaya Durga, nephew of Chiranjeevi)
 Nagendra Babu (actor, producer – brother of Chiranjeevi)
Varun Tej (actor, producer – son of Naga Babu)
Niharika Konidela (actress, producer – daughter of Naga Babu)
 Pawan Kalyan (actor, producer – brother of Chiranjeevi)

Chopra family (of Yash Chopra)

Considered to be one of the most influential families of the Hindi film industry, the Chopra family has produced some of the country's biggest blockbusters and have worked in close quarters with all the leading superstars of the industry. The founders of this family were the four children of Vilayati Raj Chopra, all of whom worked independently through different leading film production / Distribution houses:
 The eldest brother, Baldev Raj Chopra, founded B.R. Films in 1947, which is now managed and run by his son Ravi Chopra, who was also a director and a producer.
 Yash Chopra, the youngest brother, directed and produced several hits for BR Films before branching out to form his own Yash Raj Films, along with son Aditya Chopra.
 Hiroo Johar, producer who has produced several hits for Dharma Productions. Wife of Yash Johar, mother of director Karan Johar.

Chopra family of Prem Chopra

Prem Chopra (actor) 
 Sharman Joshi (actor and son in law) 
 Vikas Bhalla (actor and son in law)

Chopra family
 Priyanka Chopra (actor)
 Parineeti Chopra (actor and cousin)
 Meera Chopra (actor and cousin)
 Mannara Chopra (actor and cousin)

D

Deol family
The Deol family's legacy began with Dharmendra. He has six children: his two sons (Sunny Deol and Bobby Deol) went on to pursue film careers, and own Vijayta Films, while their sisters Vijeta Deol and Ajeeta Deol did not pursue a career in the film industry. Esha Deol and Ahana Deol are the two youngest daughters of Dharmendra (with Hema Malini). Esha has pursued a film career, whilst Dharmendra's nephew Abhay Deol has been in the industry since 2005, giving notable performances.

Devgan family
 Veeru Devgan (producer and action choreographer, father of Ajay Devgan)
 Ajay Devgan (actor, director and producer elder son of Veeru Devgan, married to Kajol)
 Kajol (actress, member of the Mukherjee-Samarth family, married to Ajay Devgan)
 Anil Devgan (director, son of Prem Prakash Devgan)

Deshmukh family
Dagadojirao Deshmukh + Sushila Deshmukh 
 Vilasrao Deshmukh (Former Chief Minister of Maharashtra) + Vaishali Deshmukh
 Amit Deshmukh (politician – elder son of Vilasrao Deshmukh)
 Riteish Deshmukh (architect, actor, producer and singer – son of Vilasrao Deshmukh)
Genelia D'Souza Deshmukh (actress, model and host – wife of Riteish Deshmukh)
 Dhiraj Deshmukh (politician – younger son of Vilasrao Deshmukh) + Deepshikha Deshmukh (Director, Producer– wife of Dheeraj Deshmukh)

Dhawan family
 Anil Dhawan (actor – brother of David Dhawan, father of Siddharth and uncle of Varun Dhawan and Rohit Dhawan)
 Siddharth Dhawan – (television actor – son of Anil Dhawan, cousin of Rohit and Varun Dhawan)
 David Dhawan (director, producer-brother of Anil Dhawan and father of Rohit and Varun Dhawan)
 Varun Dhawan (actor – son of David Dhawan and Karuna Dhawan, brother of Rohit Dhawan, nephew of Anil Dhawan and cousin of Siddharth Dhawan)
Kunal Kohli (director, producer – son of Yash Kohli (sister of Karuna Dhawan) and the late Shiv Kohli; cousin of Varun Dhawan

Dutt family (of Guru Dutt)
Vasanth Kumar Shivashankar Padukone (9 July 1925 – 10 October 1964), popularly known as Guru Dutt (Konkani:गुरु दत्त), was an Indian film director, producer and actor. He made quintessential 1950s and 1960s classics such as Pyaasa (Thirsty), Kaagaz Ke Phool (Paper Flowers), Sahib Bibi Aur Ghulam (The King, the Queen and the Jack), and Chaudhvin Ka Chand (The Fourteenth Day Moon in the Muslim calendar but actually means full moon, a metaphor for beauty). In particular, Pyaasa and Kaagaz Ke Phool are now included among the greatest films of all time, both by Time magazine's All-Time 100 best movies and by the Sight & Sound critics' and directors' poll, where Dutt himself is included among the greatest film directors of all time. In 2010, he was included among CNN's "top 25 Asian actors of all time".
 Guru Dutt (actor)
 Geeta Dutt (singer – wife of Guru Dutt)
 Shyam Benegal (director – his paternal grandmother and Dutt's maternal grandmother were sisters)
 Lalita Lajmi (Painter and sister of Guru Dutt)
 Kalpana Lajmi (director – niece of Guru Dutt)
 Amrita Rao (actress – her grandfather and Guru Dutt were second cousins)
 Preetika Rao (actress – sister of Amrita Rao, her grandfather and Guru Dutt were second cousins)
Note: Composer Kanu Roy was not the brother of Geeta Dutt

Dutt family (of Sunil Dutt)

Jaddanbai, the start of the family, began as a singer and eventually became a filmmaker. Her husband was Abdul Rashid. Their daughter Nargis began her film career at age six when cast by her mother in one of her films. Nargis went on to become a major star in the 1940s and 1950s. Sunil Dutt also acted in the industry in the 1950s. Nargis went into semi-retirement after their marriage in 1958, and full retirement in 1967, but Sunil continued to act until the early 1990s. Their son Sanjay has pursued a successful film career since 1981 and continues to act today. Nargis died from cancer in the year her son made his debut and Sunil Dutt died in May 2005.

The Dutt family is also known for its political involvement. Sunil was elected five times to the Lok Sabha (the lower house of the Parliament of India) and, at his death, was a cabinet minister under Manmohan Singh. Nargis was a nominated member of the Parliament's upper house, Rajya Sabha, and died in office in 1981. After Sunil's death, their daughter Priya Dutt ran for, and was elected to, Sunil's vacant seat in the Lok Sabha.

Nargis-Sunil Dutt's granddaughter and Sanjay Dutt's niece Sanchi Kumar (daughter of Kumar Gaurav and Namrata Dutt) is married to Indian film director Kamal Amrohi's grandson Bilal Amrohi.

 Jaddanbai
 Anwar Hussain (actor – son of Abdul Rashid and Jaddanbai)
 Akhtar Hussain (son of Jaddanbai)
 Zahida Hussain (actor – daughter of Akhtar Hussain)
 Nilesh Sahay (son of Zahida Hussain)
 Nargis (late daughter of Abdul Rashid and Jaddanbai)
 Sunil Dutt (late husband of Nargis)
 Priya Dutt (politician – daughter of Sunil and Nargis)
 Sanjay Dutt (actor – son of Sunil and Nargis)
 Richa Sharma (late wife of Sanjay Dutt)
 Manyata Dutt (wife of Sanjay Dutt)
 Nimai Bali (actor, nephew of Sunil Dutt [Sunil Dutt's sister's son] and cousin to Sanjay Dutt)
 Sahila Chadha (actress, wife of Nimai Bali)
Fatma Begum (filmmaker- alleged wife of Nawab Sidi Ibrahim Muhammad Yakut Khan III of Sachin State)
Sultana (actress- daughter of Fatma Begum and the Nawab)
Shehzadi (actress- daughter of Fatma Begum and the Nawab)
Zubeida (actress- daughter of Fatma Begum and the Nawab)
Durr-e-shahwar Dhanrajgir (daughter of Zubeida and Maharaj Narsingir Dhanrajgir Gyan Bahadur of Hyderabad)
 Rhea Pillai (actress- daughter of Raymond Pillai and Durr-e-shahwar Dhanrjgir, ex-wife of Sanjay Dutt)
 Rajendra Kumar (father of Kumar Gaurav)
 Kumar Gaurav (actor, son of Rajendra Kumar and husband of Namrata Dutt)
 Bilal Amrohi (actor, grandson of Kamal Amrohi, son-in-law of Kumar Gaurav)

Dutta family
 O. P. Dutta (filmmaker and writer)
 J. P. Dutta (producer and director, son of O. P. Dutta)
 Bindiya Goswami (actress and costume designer, wife of J. P. Dutta)

Dheer family
Pankaj Dheer (film and television actor)
 Nikitin Dheer (son of Pankaj & Anita, film and television actor)
 Kratika Sengar (wife of Nikitin Dheer, television actress)

G

Ganguly family

Ashok, Kishore, and Anoop Kumar have all acted in the film industry. Their family is related to the Mukherjee family through the marriage of Sashadhar Mukherjee to their only sister Sati Devi.
 Ashok Kumar
 Preeti Ganguly (daughter of Ashok Kumar)
 Deven Verma (son-in-law of Ashok Kumar via marriage to elder daughter Rupa Ganguly)
 Bharathi Jaffrey (actress, daughter of Ashok)
 Anuradha Patel (actress, daughter of Bharathi and granddaughter of Ashok Kumar)
 Kanwaljit Singh (husband of Anuradha)
 Kiara Advani (actress, step-granddaughter of Bharathi Jaffrey)
 Sidharth Malhotra (actor, husband of Kiara)
 Anoop Kumar (actor and first younger brother of Ashok Kumar)
 Kishore Kumar (actor and singer, youngest brother of Ashok and Anoop)
 Ruma Guha Thakurta (first wife of Kishore Kumar)
 Amit Kumar (singer, son of Kishore Kumar and Ruma Guha Thakurta)
 Madhubala (second wife of Kishore Kumar)
 Yogita Bali (third wife of Kishore Kumar)
 Leena Chandavarkar (fourth wife of Kishore Kumar)
The family is related to the Ray-Ganguly-Bose family through the first wife of Kishore Kumar, Ruma Guha Thakurta, who is a niece of Bijoya Ray.

Gautam family
 Mukesh Gautam (Punjabi film director)
 Yami Gautam (actress, daughter of Mukesh) + Aditya Dhar (writer, director, lyricist)
 Surilie Gautam (actress, sister of Yami)

Ghatak family
 Manish Ghatak (eldest son of Suresh Chandra Ghatak, Bengali poet and novelist)
 Mahasweta Devi (daughter of Manish Ghatak & Dharitri Devi, niece of Ritwik Ghatak; Indian social activist and writer)
 Bijon Bhattacharya (married to Mahasweta Devi, prominent Indian theatre and film personality from Bengal)
 Nabarun Bhattacharya (son of Bijon Bhattacharya & Mahasweta Devi)
 Parambrata Chatterjee (son of Satinath and Sunetra Ghatak Chattopadhyay – actor, director and film maker)
 Ritwik Ghatak (filmmaker, script writer and actor)

Ghattameneni family 
 Krishna (actor, director and producer)
 Vijaya Nirmala (actress and director, second wife of Krishna)
 Ramesh Babu (actor and producer, son of Krishna and Indira)
 Mahesh Babu (actor and producer, son of Krishna and Indira)
 Namrata Shirodkar (actress, wife of Mahesh Babu)
 Manjula Ghattamaneni (actress and producer, daughter of Krishna and Indira)
 Sudheer Babu (actor, husband of Priyadarshini)

Gokhale family (of Vikram Gokhale)
 Durgabai Kamat (first female artist in Indian film Industry)
 Kamlabai Gokhale (daughter of Durgabai Kamat, first female child artist in Indian film industry)
 Chandrakant Gokhale (son of Kamlabai, actor)
 Vikram Gokhale (actor, son of Chandrakanta, and National award-winning actor)

Gokhale family (Mohan Gokhale)
 Mohan Gokhale (actor)
 Shubhangi Gokhale (actress, wife of Mohan)
 Sakhi Gokhale  (actress, daughter of Mohan)
Suvrat Joshi (actor, husband of Sakhi Gokhale)

Goswami family (of Hindi films)
Manoj Kumar was born as Harikishan Goswami in 1937 in Abbottabad. He started his film career in 1957. But it was films like Pathar ke Sanam and Woh Kaun Thi which gave him his fame. His career took off on a different path when he launched his production house Vishal International, making classics like Upkar, Purab aur Paschim, Roti Kapda aur Makan and Kranti which earned him the title of "Bharat Kumar". Though he is a Bollywood legend, his sons were unsuccessful in Bollywood.
 Manoj Kumar (actor, producer and director)
Kunal Goswami (actor – son of Manoj Kumar)

Goswami family (of Assamese films)

Moloya Goswami (actress)
Nishita Goswami (actress – daughter of Pradip Goswami and Moloya Goswami)

Ahuja Family (Govinda's Family)
 Arun Kumar Ahuja (father of Govinda)
 Nirmala Devi (mother of Govinda)
 Govinda (son of Arun and Nirmala)
 Tina Ahuja (daughter of Govinda)
 Krushna Abhishek (comedian, actor, nephew of Govinda)
 Kashmera Shah (actress, wife of Krushna)
 Arti Singh (actress, sister of Krushna Abhishek and niece of Govinda)
 Vinay Anand (nephew of Govinda)
 Ragini Khanna (actress, sister of Amit and niece of Govinda)
 Soumya Seth (actress, cousin of Krushna Abhishek, Arti, Amit and Ragini)
Kumkum, half-sister of Nirmala Devi (same father)

Gulzar family
 Gulzar (lyricist, writer and director)
 Raakhee Gulzar (actress – wife of Gulzar)
 Meghna Gulzar (director – daughter of Gulzar and Rakhee)

H

Haasan–Ratnam family
Originated in Tamil Nadu, Kamal Haasan and Mani Ratnam are two of the biggest names in the industry.
Kamal Haasan, Actor, film producer, film director, screenwriter, playback singer, lyricist, television presenter, choreographer, dancer, philanthropist & politician
Vani Ganapathy, actress; ex-wife of Kamal Haasan.
Sarika Thakur, actress; ex-wife of Kamal Haasan.
Shruti Haasan, actress & singer; daughter of Kamal Haasan and Sarika.
Akshara Haasan, actress; daughter of Kamal Haasan and Sarika.
Gautami Tadimalla, actress; ex-partner of Kamal Haasan.
Charuhasan, actor; brother of Kamal Haasan.
Suhasini, actress; daughter of Charuhasan and Komalam.
Mani Ratnam, director; husband of Suhasini.
G. Venkateswaran, producer (d. 2003); brother of Mani Ratnam.
G. Srinivasan, producer (d. 2007); brother of Mani Ratnam.
Chandrahasan, producer (d. 2017); brother of Kamal Haasan.
Anu Haasan, actress; daughter of Chandrahasan.

J

Jaffrey family
 Jagdeep (actor and comedian(Note:-famous for Surma Bhopali-Iconic Sholay Movie)
 Javed Jaffrey (actor, comedian, host, son Of Jagdeep)
 Naved Jaffrey (actor, dancer, host, son Of Jagdeep, brother of Javed Jaffrey and uncle of Meezan Jafri)
 Meezaan Jafri (actor, son of Javed and grandson of Jagdeep)

K

Kapoor family (of Jeetendra)
 Jeetendra a.k.a. Ravi Kapoor (actor)
 Shobha Kapoor (wife of Jeetendra)
 Tusshar Kapoor (actor – son of Jeetendra)
 Ekta Kapoor (producer – daughter of Jeetendra)
 Nitin Kapoor (cousin of Jeetendra)
 Jayasudha (actress and politician – wife of Nitin Kapoor) (see  Nidudavolu family)
 Abhishek Kapoor (director and actor – nephew of Jeetendra)

Kapoor family (of Prithviraj Kapoor)

The oldest family in the industry, the Kapoor family, has been in the industry since 1926, starting with Dewan Bisheswar Kapoor and his son Prithviraj Kapoor. His descendants have carried on with the family tradition of acting. Raj Kapoor, Shammi Kapoor, Shashi Kapoor, Rishi Kapoor, Karisma Kapoor, Kareena Kapoor, and Ranbir Kapoor are the success stories from the Kapoor clan. Others who tried their hand with less success include Rajiv Kapoor (Raj's son), and Karan Kapoor and Kunal Kapoor (Shashi's sons). Shashi Kapoor's daughter, Sanjana Kapoor, with brother Kunal, has been successfully running Prithvi Theatre, founded in 1944 by Prithviraj Kapoor.

Raj Kapoor married Krishna Malhotra, sister of actor Prem Nath from Malhotra family. Raj's grandson and Ritu Nanda's son, industrialist Nikhil Nanda, married Shweta Bachchan, daughter of Amitabh Bachchan from the Bachchan family. Raj's granddaughter Kareena Kapoor married Saif Ali Khan from the Pataudi family. Raj Kapoor's maternal cousin, actor Jugal Kishore Mehra, married actor/singer Anwari Begum, the lead actor of the first Punjabi film Heer Ranjha.

.

Kapoor family (of Surinder Kapoor)
Surinder Kapoor was the one who introduced his family to the world of Bollywood. Surinder Kapoor started his career as Geeta Bali's secretary and went on to become a producer. He also happens to be a distant relative of Prithviraj Kapoor. He served as president of the Film & Television Producers Guild of India for six years. He married Nirmal Devi and has four children – Boney, Anil, Reena and Sanjay Kapoor.

 Surinder Kapoor
 Boney Kapoor (son of Surinder Kapoor and Nirmal Kapoor)
 Arjun Kapoor (son of Boney Kapoor and Mona Shourie Kapoor)
 Anshula Kapoor (daughter of Boney Kapoor and Mona Shourie Kapoor)
 Janhvi Kapoor (daughter of Boney Kapoor and Sridevi)
 Khushi Kapoor (daughter of Boney Kapoor and Sridevi)
 Anil Kapoor (son of Surinder Kapoor and Nirmal Kapoor), married to Sunita Bhavnani 
 Sonam Kapoor (daughter of Anil Kapoor and Sunita Kapoor)
 Rhea Kapoor (daughter of Anil Kapoor and Sunita Kapoor)
 Harshvardhan Kapoor (son of Anil Kapoor and Sunita Kapoor)
 Sanjay Kapoor (son of Surinder Kapoor and Nirmal Kapoor), married to Mahdeep Sandhu
 Shanaya Kapoor (daughter of Sanjay Kapoor and Maheep Sandhu) 
 Jahaan Kapoor (son of Sanjay Kapoor and Maheep Sandhu) 
 Reena Kapoor Marwah (daughter of Surinder Kapoor and Nirmal Kapoor), married to Sandeep Marwah
 Mohit Marwah (son of Sandeep Marwah and Reena Kapoor Marwah)

Kapoor family (of Shakti Kapoor)
 Shakti Kapoor + Shivangi Kolhapure (sister of actress Padmini Kolhapure and member of the Mangeshkar-Hardikar-Abhisheki family)
 Shraddha Kapoor (actress – daughter of Shakti Kapoor and Shivangi Kolhapure)
 Siddhanth Kapoor (actor – son of Shakti Kapoor and Shivangi Kolhapure)

Kapur–Pathak–Shah family
 Shanta Gandhi (1917–2002) – theatre director,  dancer (sister of Dina Pathak)
 Dina Pathak (née Gandhi) (1922–2002) – Theatre and film actor (mother of Ratna Pathak and Supriya Pathak)
Ratna Pathak (born 1957) – television and film actress, elder daughter of Dina Pathak, wife of Naseeruddin Shah
 Naseeruddin Shah (born 1950) – film and theater actor (formerly married Parveen Murad, a.k.a. "Manara Sikri," sister of actor Surekha Sikri)
 Imaad Shah (b.1986 ) – singer, songwriter, film actor (son of Naseeruddin Shah and Ratna Pathak)
 Vivaan Shah (born 1990) – film actor (son of Naseruddin Shah and Ratna Pathak)
 Mohommed Ali Shah (born 1979) – theatre and film actor; son of Zameer Uddin Shah and thus nephew of Naseeruddin Shah
 Supriya Pathak (born 1961) – theatre and film actress, younger daughter of Dina Pathak, wife of Pankaj Kapur
 Pankaj Kapur (born 1954) – theatre, television and film actor, formerly married to Neelima Azeem
 Neelima Azeem (born 1959) – television and film actress, married three times, including to actors Pankaj Kapur and Rajesh Khattar
Shahid Kapoor (born 1981) – film actor (son of Pankaj Kapur and Neelima Azeem)
 Ishaan Khatter (born 1995) – film actor (son of Rajesh Khattar and Neelima Azeem)
 Manoj Pahwa (born 1963) – film and television actor (married to Seema Pahwa, father-in-law of Sanah Kapur) 
 Seema Pahwa (born 1962) – film and television actress and a filmmaker
 Sanah Kapur (born 1993) – film actor; daughter of Pankaj Kapur and Supriya Pathak; wife of Mayank Pahwa
 Mayank Pahwa – film actor (spouse of Sanah Kapur and son of Manoj Pahwa and Seema Pahwa)

Kaushal family

 Sham Kaushal (Action director in Indian films - winner of five 5 Filmfare Awards for Best Action Director). 
 Vicky Kaushal (Film actor - elder son of Sham Kaushal, married to Katrina Kaif)
 Katrina Kaif (Film actress - married to Vicky Kaushal)
 Sunny Kaushal (Film actor - younger son of Sham Kaushal)

Khan family (of Feroz Khan)

Khan family (of Salim Khan)

Story and script writer Salim Khan has written and produced some of the most successful Bollywood films. He formed a pair with Javed Akhtar and began writing as Salim–Javed. The duo have written many commercially and critically successful movies all through the 1970s and 1980s like  Yaadon Ki Baraat (Nasir Hussain), Deewaar (Yash Chopra), Dostana (Yash Johar), Sholay (Ramesh Sippy), Mr. India (Shekhar Kapoor) and Don – The Chase Begins Again (Farhan Akhtar). His eldest son, Salman, made his film debut at the age of 22 with Biwi Ho To Aisi (1988) and went on to become one of the most successful superstars of Indian cinema. His second son, Arbaaz Khan, is a successful actor and filmmaker whose films include Dabangg and Dabangg 2. His third son, Sohail Khan, is an actor and film maker. His elder daughter Alvira is married to the actor Atul Agnihotri. It is only his second daughter Arpita who has kept away from the field of films.

Salim Khan met and married Sushila Charak, a Hindu woman from a Marathi family. She took the name 'Salma Khan' and they have four children (three sons and a daughter). In later life, Salim Khan married Helen, and took her as his second wife while still married to Sushila/Salma. This arrangement was accepted by both ladies, and by all four of his children by his first wife. The family then adopted a girl, Arpita Khan, who was formally adopted by Helen and raised amid the entire family in their family home in Galaxy Apartments, Bandra Bandstand, Mumbai. Eventually, the two daughters (Alvira and Arpita) married and left to raise their own families, while two of the three sons (Arbaaz and Sohail) married. They live together, as per the Joint family traditions.
 Salim Khan - (Actor , Scriptwriter) (born 1935)
 Salma Khan (née Sushila Charak) (first wife of Salim Khan) (born 1942)
 Helen (second wife of Salim Khan) (born 1939)
 Salman Khan (eldest son of Salim Khan and Sushila Charak Khan) (born 1965)
 Arbaaz Khan (director, producer, writer and actor – second son of Salim Khan and Sushila Charak Khan) (born 1967)
 Malaika Arora (model and actress), Ex-wife of Arbaaz Khan and sister of actress Amrita Arora
 Sohail Khan (director, producer, writer and actor – third son of Salim Khan and Sushila Charak Khan) (born 1970)
 Alvira Khan Agnihotri, daughter of Salim Khan and Sushila Charak Khan, wife of Atul Agnihotri
 Atul Agnihotri, film director, producer and writer; husband of Alvira Khan Agnihotri

Khan-Banu family (of Yusuf Khan aka Dilip Kumar and Saira Banu)
Dilip Kumar was born as Muhammad Yusuf Khan in 1922, and became one of India's most acclaimed actors. His wife Saira Banu is also a successful actress in Bollywood. His brother Nasir Khan, brother-in-law K. Asif and nephew Ayub Khan are among those who followed him into films, and his wife Saira Banu is also related to several film personalities.
 Dilip Kumar (actor, producer)
 Saira Banu (actress) – wife of Dilip Kumar

Dilip Kumar's relatives
 K. Asif (filmmaker) – his wife, Akhtar Asif, was the sister of Dilip Kumar. His other wife was actress Nigar Sultana.
 Nazir Ahmed Khan (actor), cousin and also brother-in-law of K. Asif; his first wife Sikandara Begum was K. Asif's sister
 Nasir Khan (actor) – brother of Dilip Kumar, father of actor Ayub Khan.
 Begum Para (actress) – wife of Nasir Khan, mother of actor Ayub Khan.
 Ayub Khan (actor) – son of Nasir Khan and Begum Para, nephew of Dilip Kumar
 Zarina Sultana- sister of Begum Para
 Rukhsana Sultana (social activist) – daughter of Zarina Sultana
 Amrita Singh (actress) – daughter of Rukhsana Sultana and ex-wife of actor Saif Ali Khan (see Pataudi family)

Saira Banu's relatives
 Naseem Banu (actress), mother of Saira Banu and grandmother of actress Shaheen Bano.
 Saira Banu (actress) – wife of Dilip Kumar
 Sumeet Saigal (ex-husband of Shaheen Banu)
 Sayesha Saigal (actress, daughter of Sumeet Saigal and Shaheen Banu Saigal)
 Arya (actor, producer, husband of Sayyeshaa)

Khan–Hussain family (of Nasir Hussain)
The Khan–Hussain family starts with Nasir Hussain, who is the eldest man in the family. He is a veteran film writer, producer and director and made his writing debut with the 1953 super hit, Anarkali for Filmistan studios, where he joined as a freelancer. Nasir later went on to start his own production house named Nasir Hussain Films and made evergreen cult films like Teesri Manzil and Yaadon Ki Baraat. Nasir Hussain's younger brother, Tahir Hussain, is also a filmmaker and has been a producer for a number of films. Nasir Hussain has two children; an elder son Mansoor Khan, and a younger daughter, Nuzhat Khan. Nuzhat Khan married a convert to Islam, Anil Pal, an engineer, and had one child, Imran Khan. Tahir Hussain and his wife Zeenat Hussain have four children; Farhat Khan, Aamir Khan, Faisal Khan, and Nikhat Khan. Nasir Hussain launched both Mansoor Khan and Aamir Khan with the 1988 blockbuster Qayamat Se Qayamat Tak, which was produced by Nassir Hussain Films and co-written by the two brothers in their younger days. Aamir Khan's younger brother Faisal Khan is also an actor. Mansoor Khan and Aamir Khan later launched their nephew, Imran Khan, with Jaane Tu... Ya Jaane Na in 2008. The film was made under the Aamir Khan Productions banner and was a huge hit.
 Tahir Hussain (producer, director and screenwriter – father of Aamir Khan)
 Aamir Khan (actor, director and producer – uncle to Imran Khan)
 Kiran Rao (producer, screenwriter and director – former wife of Aamir Khan). Actress Aditi Rao Hydari is a cousin of Kiran Rao.
 Faisal Khan (actor – brother of Aamir Khan)
 Nikhat Khan (producer – sister of Aamir Khan)
 Nasir Hussain (producer, director and screenwriter – uncle of Aamir Khan and grandfather to Imran Khan)
 Mansoor Khan (producer, director and screenwriter – cousin to Aamir Khan and uncle of Imran Khan)
 Tariq Khan (actor – cousin to Aamir Khan and uncle of Imran Khan)
 Imran Khan (actor – his mother Nuzhat is the daughter of Nasir Khan and cousin of Aamir Khan)
 Raj Zutshi (actor – step-father of Imran Khan as the second husband of Nuzhat Khan Zutshi)

Khan family (of Zakaria Khan) 
The family line starts with actor Zakaria Khan, known by his screen name as Jayant. His sons are actors Amjad Khan, (popular for his role of Gabbar Singh in the film Sholay) and Imtiaz Khan (worked in few films like Yaadon Ki Baaraat, Dharmatma, Dayavan). 
 Jayant (Zakaria Khan)
 Amjad Khan, son of Zakaria Khan. He married Shehla Khan.
 Shadaab Khan, son of Amjad Khan and Shehla Khan
 Seemaab Khan, son of Amjad Khan and Shehla Khan
 Zafar Karachiwala, husband of Ahlam Khan
 Imtiaz Khan, son of Zakaria Khan.
 Krutika Desai Khan, wife of Imtiaz Khan
 Ayesha Khan, daughter of Imtiaz and Krutika

Khanna-Kapadia-Bhatia family
Khanna family starts with Rajesh Khanna (born Jatin Khanna;) he was a Bollywood actor, film producer and politician. He is referred to as the "first superstar" and the "original superstar" of Indian cinema. He starred in 15 consecutive solo hit films in the period 1969 to 1971, still an unbroken record.

Rajesh Khanna and Dimple Kapadia's daughters Twinkle Khanna, and Rinkle Khanna have also acted in the industry. Twinkle Khanna left the industry after her marriage to actor Akshay Kumar.
 Rajesh Khanna + Dimple Kapadia (actress – wife of Rajesh Khanna)
 Twinkle Khanna (actress – eldest daughter of Rajesh Khanna and Dimple Kapadia) + Akshay Kumar (actor and producer – son-in-law of Rajesh Khanna and Dimple Kapadia)
 Rinkle Khanna (actress – younger daughter of Rajesh Khanna and Dimple Kapadia) + Sameer Saran
 1 daughter
 Simple Kapadia (costume designer and actress – sister of Dimple Kapadia)

Khanna family (of Vinod Khanna)
Vinod Khanna was a popular and successful actor in the film industry in the 1970s and 1980s. His sons Akshaye and Rahul both pursued a film career though Rahul has not been as successful.
 Vinod Khanna
 Rahul Khanna (eldest son of Vinod Khanna and Gitanjali Taleyarkhan)
 Akshaye Khanna (youngest son of Vinod Khanna and Gitanjali Taleyarkhan)

Khote family 
Durga Khote was a Dadasaheb Phalke Award recipient known for her performances in Mughal-e-Azam, Bobby, Bidaai etc.
 Durga Khote
 Vijaya Mehta (actress, daughter-in-law of Durga Khote and Widow of Harin Khote)
 Anahita Uberoi (actress, daughter of Vijaya Mehta from her second marriage)
 Shubha Khote (actress and niece to Durga Khote)
 Bhavna Balsavar (actress, daughter of Shubha Khote, wife of Karan shah)
 Viju Khote (actor and nephew to Durga Khote)

Kher family
The Kher family includes the actors Anupam Kher and Kirron Kher. Their son is actor Sikander Kher. Anupam has starred in the international hit Bend It Like Beckham. He recently won the best actor award given by the Karachi International Film Festival for Maine Gandhi Ko Nahin Mara (2005). Kirron Kher won the Bronze Leopard Award given by the Locarno International Film Festival for Khamosh Pani: Silent Waters (2003).
 Anupam Kher
 Raju Kher (actor – brother of Anupam Kher)
 Kirron Kher (actress – wife of Anupam Kher)
 Sikander Kher (actor – son of Kirron Kher from first marriage)

Khurrana/Khurana family
 Ayushmann Khurrana – actor, singer, writer. 
 Aparshakti Khurana (actor, singer – brother of Ayushmann Khurrana).

Kumar family
Gulshan Kumar was the founder of the T-Series (Super Cassettes Industries Ltd.), the best known as music label in India, and an Indian Bollywood movie producer.
 Gulshan Kumar 
 Bhushan Kumar (son of Gulshan Kumar) + Divya Khosla Kumar (actress and producer – wife of Bhushan Kumar)
 Tulsi Kumar (singer – younger daughter of Gulshan Kumar)
 Krishan Kumar (younger brother of Gulshan Kumar) + Tanya Singh - wife of Krishan Kumar

L

Lulla family
Mr. Arjun Lulla was the founder of Eros International, best known for film distribution and production in India.
 Arjan Lulla, founded Eros International in 1977, life president of the company
 Kishore Lulla, chairman and director of Eros International plc, the first Indian Media & entertainment company listed on New York stock exchange; also known for being the biggest overseas Bollywood distributor
 Sunil Lulla, chairman and executive director of Eros International; produced over 40 films for the company including several hits
 Krishika Lulla, wife of Sunil Lulla; Bollywood producer

M

Mumtazullah Khan family
 Uzra Butt (sister of Zohra Sehgal)
 Zohra Sehgal (sister of Uzra Butt)
 Kiran Segal (daughter of Zohra Sehgal)
 Samiya Mumtaz (grandniece of Zohra Sehgal and Uzra Butt)
 Hajrah Begum - Indian Politician and sister of Zohra and Uzra
 Kumud Mishra - Husband of Ayesha, Hindi movie and theatre actor

Malhotra family
 Prem Nath (actor)
 Bina Rai (actress – wife of Prem Nath)
 Prem Krishen (actor – son of Prem Nath and Bina Rai)
Akanksha Malhotra (actress - daughter of Prem Krishen)
Sidharth Malhotra (director - son of Prem Krishen)
 Kailash Nath (son of Prem Nath and Bina Rai)
Adiraj Malhotra (son of Kailash Nath)
Arjun Malhotra (director – son of Kailash Nath)
 Rajendra Nath (actor – brother of Prem Nath)
 Narendra Nath (actor – brother of Prem Nath)
 Krishna Malhotra (sister of Prem Nath) - married to Raj Kapoor
Uma Malhotra (sister of Prem Nath) - married to Prem Chopra

Malik family

 Sardar Malik was a music director in the 1900s.
 Anu Malik (music composer – son of Sardaar Malik)
 Anmol Malik (singer and songwriter – elder daughter of Anu Malik)
Abu Malik (music composer – second son of Sardaar Malik)
 Aadar Mallik (singer and songwriter – son of Abu Malik)
 Daboo Malik (music director – youngest son of Sardaar Malik)
 Amaal Mallik (music composer – elder son of Daboo Malik)
 Armaan Malik (singer – younger son of Daboo Malik)
 Hasrat Jaipuri (lyricist – brother-in-law of Sardaar Malik)

Mukesh-Mathur family
 Mukesh Chand Mathur (singer) + Sarla Trivedi Raichand
 Nitin Mukesh (singer – son of Mukesh)
 Neil Nitin Mukesh (actor – son of Nitin Mukesh and grandson of Mukesh) + Rukmini Sahay

Mammootty family 
 Mammootty (three time National Award winning actor and film producer, who has acted in films in five languages including Malayalam, Tamil, Telugu, Kannada and Hindi. He predominantly works in Malayalam cinema)
 Ibrahim Kutty (actor - Brother of Mammootty)
 Dulquer Salmaan (actor and producer, who has acted in films in four languages including Malayalam, Tamil, Telugu and Hindi. He predominantly works in Malayalam cinema. He is the younger son of Mammootty)
 Maqbool Salmaan (actor – nephew of Mammootty (Son of Ibrahim Kutty))
 Ashkar Saudan (actor – nephew of Mammootty)

Mangeshkar-Hardikar-Abhisheki extended family

 Deenanath Mangeshkar (musician and theatre actor – son of Ganesh Bhatt Navathe Hardikar (Abhisheki)) by his mistress Yesubai
 Lata Mangeshkar (singer – eldest daughter of Deenanath Mangeshkar)
 Hridaynath Mangeshkar (music composer and singer – son of Deenanath Mangeshkar)
 Meena Khadikar (singer – daughter of Deenanath Mangeshkar)
 Usha Mangeshkar (singer – daughter of Deenanath Mangeshkar)
 Asha Bhosle (singer – daughter of Deenanath Mangeshkar) + Ganpatrao Bhosle (first husband of Asha Bhosle) and R. D. Burman (composer – second husband of Asha Bhosle and son of S. D. Burman, grandson of Nabadwipchandra Dev Burman, and great-grandson of Ishan Chandra Manikya)
Varsha Bhosle (daughter of Asha and Ganpatrao Bhosle)
 Jitendra Abhisheki (musician – son of Deenanath Mangeshkar's paternal half-brother Balwantrao Abhisheki)
 Shounak Abhisheki (vocalist, composer, son of Jitendra Abhisheki)
 Padmini Kolhapure (actress – middle daughter of Pandharinath Kolhapure). Married Bollywood producer Tutu Sharma.
 Tejaswini Kolhapure (actress – youngest daughter of Pandharinath Kolhapure)
 Siddhanth Kapoor (actor – son of Shakti and Shivangi Kapoor)
 Shraddha Kapoor (actress, singer, designer, lyricist – daughter of Shakti and Shivangi Kapoor)

Mohanlal family
 Mohanlal (Actor, Producer, Director, Playback Singer)
 Pranav Mohanlal (actor, playback singer – son of Mohanlal)
 K.Balaji (producer – father-in-law of Mohanlal)
 Suresh Balaje (executive producer – brother-in-law of Mohanlal)

Mukherjee family

Manas Mukherjee (music director – son of Jahar Mukherjee)
Shaan (singer, actor and TV presenter – son of Manas Mukherjee)
Sagarika (singer and actress – daughter of Manas Mukherjee)

Mukherjee–Samarth family

The Mukherjee-Samarth family has been active in the film industry since the 1940s when Rattan Bai, mother of actor Shobhana Samarth, acted in various films. The current members of the Mukherjee-Samarth family who working are in the industry are actor Tanuja, actress Kajol (married to actor Ajay Devgan), actress Rani Mukerji (married to producer-director Aditya Chopra), actress Tanisha, and actor Mohnish Behl. Their family married into the Ganguly brothers. The Mukherjees and Samarths came together by marriage between producer Sashadhar Mukherjee and Sati Devi's son Shomu Mukherjee and Shobhana Samarth and director Kumarsen Samarth's daughter Tanuja. Shomu Mukherjee's cousin married the sister of actor Debashree Roy.

Murad–Rai family
 Murad (actor)
Raza Murad (actor, son of Murad)
Sanober Kabir (actress and niece of Raza Murad and Daughter of Sabiha)
Faruk Kabir (director, producer and son of Sabiha)
Rukhsar Rehman (actress and wife of Faruk)
Sonam (actress, niece of Raza Murad and ex-wife of Rajiv Rai, Daughter of Talat)
Gulshan Rai (film producer)
 Rajiv Rai (director, writer, son of Gulshan Rai)
Amanullah Khan (script writer and brother-in-law of Murad)
Zeenat Aman (actress, daughter of Amanullah Khan)
Mazhar Khan (actor, husband of Zeenat Aman)

N

Nandamuri family 
 Nandamuri Taraka Rama Rao (28 May 1923 – 18 January 1996), popularly known as NTR, was a Telugu cinema actor, filmmaker and politician who served as Chief Minister of Andhra Pradesh over three terms.
 Basavatarakam-1st wife of  NTR
 Nandamuri Harikrishna (actor, politician)-Son of NTR
 Nandamuri Taraka Rama Rao (grandson of NTR, S/O Nandamuri Harikrishna)
 Nandamuri Kalyan Ram (grandson of NTR, S/O Nandamuri Harikrishna)
 Nandamuri Balakrishna (actor, politician)-Son of NTR
 Daggubati Purandeswari (politician)-D/O NTR
 Nara Chandrababu Naidu (ex. Chief Minister of Andhra Pradesh)-H/O Bhuvaneshwari
 Nara Lokesh (politician, Cabinet Minister of Andhra Pradesh) (grandson of SR NTR, S/O Nara Chandrababu Naidu)
 Nandamuri Taraka Ratna (grandson of SR NTR, S/O Nandamuri Mohankrishna)
 Lakshmi Parvathi (author, politician)-2nd W/O NTR

Narayan Jha family
 Udit Narayan Jha (singer)
 Aditya Narayan Jha (singer and TV presenter – son of Udit Narayan)
 Shweta Agarwal (Actress and W/O Aditya Narayan)

O

Oberoi family
 Suresh Oberoi (actor)
 Vivek Oberoi (actor – son of Suresh and Yashodhara Oberoi)
 Akshay Oberoi (actor – nephew of Suresh Oberoi)
 Neha Uberoi (tennis player - niece of Suresh)
 Shikha Uberoi (tennis player - niece of Suresh)

P

Pal family
 Bipin Chandra Pal (Indian nationalist, associated with the trio "Lal, Bal and Pal".)
 Niranjan Pal (playwright, screenwriter and director – son of Bipin Chandra Pal)
 Colin Pal (actor, technician, journalist and publicist – son of Niranjan Pal)
 Deep Pal (cinematographer – son of Colin Pal)

Pandit family
 Pandit Maniram (guru and elder brother of Pandit Jasraj)
 Pandit Dinesh – Musician
 Pandit Jasraj (Indian classical vocalist)
 Durga Jasraj (television presenter, daughter of Pandit Jasraj) 
 Jatin Pandit (composer, son of Pandit Pratap Narayan)
 Lalit Pandit (composer, son of Pandit Pratap Narayan)
 Sulakshana Pandit (playback singer and actress – daughter of Pandit Pratap Narayan)
 Vijayta Pandit (actress and playback singer – daughter of Pandit Pratap Narayan)
 Aadesh Shrivastava composer, husband of Vijayata Pandit
 Shweta Pandit (singer, daughter of Sulakshana and Vijayta Pandit's brother tabla player Vishwaraj Pandit)
 Shrraddha Pandit (singer, daughter of Vishwaraj Pandit)
 Yash Pandit (actor, son of Vishwaraj Pandit)

 Hemlata (singer – cousin of Sulakshana Pandit)
 Jagdish Prasad (Indian classical vocalist – cousin of Sulakshana Pandit)
 Samrat Pandit (Indian Classical vocalist – son of Jagdish Prasad)
 Santhosh Pandit (Indian Film actor/producer/director/scriptwriter/lyricist/composer/choreographer/singer/editor/philanthropist – son of Wawwal Pandit)

Pataudi family

Actress Sharmila Tagore married Mansoor Ali Khan Pataudi, a cricket player in the 1960s and 70s and the 9th and last Nawab of Pataudi. Two of their children, Saif Ali Khan and Soha Ali Khan, and a granddaughter, Sara Ali Khan, are actors. Both Saif and Soha have also married actors.

Patel family
 Ameesha Patel (actress – daughter of Asha Patel and Amit Patel).
 Ashmit Patel (actor and reality show star – son of Asha Patel and Amit Patel)

Puri family
Madan Puri was probably the best known villain in the film industry in the 1950s and late 1960s. His brothers Chaman Puri and Amrish Puri were also very successful actors of their time.
 Chaman Puri (elder brother of Madan Puri and Amrish Puri)
 Madan Puri (second brother of Chaman Puri and Amrish Puri)
 Amrish Puri (youngest brother of Chaman Puri and Madan Puri)
 K.L. Saigal (singer, first cousin of Madan and Amrish Puri)
 Vardhan Puri (actor, grandson Of Amrish Puri)

Pilgaokar

Sachin Pilgaonkar (actor, director, producer)
Supriya Pilgaonkar (actor, wife of Sachin Pilgaokar)
Shriya Pilgaonkar (actor, daughter of Sachin and Supriya Pilgaokar)

R

Rajinikanth family

 Rajinikanth (actor, producer and screenwriter)
 Latha Rajinikanth (film producer and playback singer – wife of Rajinikanth)
 Aishwarya Rajinikanth (film producer and director – daughter of Rajinikanth)
 Dhanush (actor) - husband of Aishwarya, son-in-law of Rajinikanth
 Soundarya Rajinikanth (graphic designer, film producer and director – daughter of Rajinikanth)
 Anirudh Ravichander (music director and playback singer – nephew of Rajinikanth)
 Ravi Raghavendra (actor – father of Anirudh, brother-in-law of Rajinikanth)
 Y. G. Mahendra (actor, dramatist – brother-in-law of Latha Rajinikanth, co-brother of Rajinikanth)
 Madhuvanti Arun (actress, daughter of Y. G. Mahendra)
 Vyjanthimala (actress, cousin of Y. G. Mahendra)
 K. Balaji (producer, Y. G. Mahendra's uncle)
 Mohanlal (actor, son-in-law to K. Balaji)
 Pranav Mohanlal (actor, son of Mohanlal)

Rajkumar family
 Rajkumar (actor and singer)
 Parvathamma Rajkumar (producer – wife of Rajkumar)
 Shiva Rajkumar (actor – son of Rajkumar)
 Bangarappa (politician) - father-in-law of Shiva Rajkumar 
 Kumar Bangarappa (actor and politician) - brother-in-law of Shiva Rajkumar 
 Madhu Bangarappa (politician) - brother-in-law of Shiva Rajkumar 
 Raghavendra Rajkumar (actor and producer – son of Rajkumar)
 Vinay Rajkumar (actor – son of Raghavendra Rajkumar)
 Yuva Rajkumar (actor – son of Raghavendra Rajkumar)
 Puneeth Rajkumar (actor and playback singer – son of Rajkumar)
 Ramkumar (actor – son-in-law of Rajkumar)
 Dheeren Ramkumar (actor — son of Ramkumar)
 Dhanya Ramkumar (actress — daughter of Ramkumar)
 S. A. Chinne Gowda (producer – brother of Parvathamma Rajkumar)
 Vijay Raghavendra (actor – son of S. A. Chinne Gowda)
 Sriimurali (actor – son of S. A. Chinne Gowda)
 Prashanth Neel (director- brother-in-law of Sriimurali)

Ramsay family
The Ramsays were seven brothers who had achieved cult status for producing low-budget horror films through the 1970s and 1980s, going into the early 1990s. They were the sons of Fatehchand Uttamchand (FU) Ramsay, who had shifted to Mumbai (then Bombay) from Karachi after Partition with his wife and children. In Karachi, the Ramsays (originally Ramsinghani) ran a radio store, and set  in Mumbai before shifting to movies. FU Ramsay tried his hand first, but was a failure. But the brothers hit upon the idea of making horror films, starting with Do Gaz Zameen Ke Neeche in 1972. They chose low-cost options, with family members handling most of the key bits of the film-making process. They chose actors who didn't cost too much and shot at actual locations instead of spending on sets. Some of their best known films are Darwaza, Dahshat, Purana Mandir and Veerana. Though they stopped making films together afterwards, most of them continued to be a part of the movies, especially Keshu Ramsay, who produced a number of successful films with Akshay Kumar and made the brilliant Khakee in 2004. The brothers – apart from Keshu – did, however, come together to produce the extremely successful Zee Horror Show, which later became Anhonee, for television.
 Tulsi Ramsay (producer and director, son of F. U. Ramsay)
 Keshu Ramsay (cinematographer and producer, son of F. U. Ramsay)
 Aryeman (actor, producer and director, son of Keshu Ramsay)
 Shyam Ramsay (director and producer, son of F. U. Ramsay)
 Kiran Ramsay (sound recordist and producer, son of F. U. Ramsay)

Randhawa family

 Dara Singh (Wrestler and Actor)
 Vindu Dara Singh (actor, son of Dara Singh)
 Farah Naaz (actress, ex-wife of Vindu Dara Singh)
 Randhawa (wrestler and actor, brother of Dara Singh)
 Malika (wife of Randhawa)
 Shaad Randhawa (actor, son of Randhawa)
 Mumtaz (actress, sister of Malika related to Roshan Khan family)

Roy Kapur—Balan family
 Siddharth Roy Kapur (film producer, brother of Aditya and Kunaal)
 Aditya Roy Kapur (actor, brother of Siddharth and Kunaal)
 Kunaal Roy Kapur (actor, brother of Siddharth and Aditya)
 Vidya Balan (actress, wife of Siddharth Roy Kapur)
 Priyamani (actress, cousin of Vidya Balan)
 Malgudi Subha (singer, aunt of Priyamani)

Ray–Ganguly–Bose family
 Dwarkanath Ganguly (Social reformer, father-in-law of Upendrakishore Ray)
 Kadambini Ganguly (one of the two first female graduates & one of the two first female physicians in India, second wife of Dwarkanath Ganguly)
 Upendrakishore Ray (writer, painter, violinist, composer, technologist and entrepreneur)
 Hemendra Mohan Bose (entrepreneur, brother-in-law of Upendrakishore Ray)
 Sukumar Ray (poet, story writer and playwright – son of Upendrakishore Ray)
 Shukhalata Rao (author, daughter of Upendrakishore Ray)
 Leela Majumdar (author, daughter of Surama Devi and Pramada Ranjan Ray, the younger brother of Upendrakishore Ray)
 Nitin Bose (film director, son of Hemendra Bose)
 Kartick Bose, Ganesh Bose, Bapi Bose (Bengal cricketers, brothers of Nitin Bose)
 Malati Ghoshal (singer, daughter of Hemendra Bose)
 Satyajit Ray (film director, producer, screenwriter, writer, music director and lyricist – son of Sukumar Ray)
 Bijoya Ray (actor and playback singer – wife of Satyajit Ray)
 Sandip Ray (director – son of Satyajit Ray and Bijoya Ray)
The family is related to Ganguly family through the marriage of Ruma Guha Thakurta, niece of Bijoya Ray to Kishore Kumar.

Roshan family 
Rakesh Roshan was an actor from the 1960s to the 1980s. Towards the 1990s he started directing films. His brother Rajesh is a music director and does the music for Rakesh's films. Rakesh introduced his son Hrithik Roshan in 2000 in the film Kaho Na Pyaar Hai which made Hrithik a star overnight.
Feroz Khan was an actor, film editor, producer and director from the 1960s till 2007. He introduced his son Fardeen Khan in 1998 in the film Prem Aggan for which Fardeen won the Filmfare Best Debut Award.

Mumtaz was a popular actress in the 1960s–70s. She left the industry after her marriage to Mayur Madhvani.
 Roshan 
Ira Roshan (wife of Roshan)
Rakesh Roshan (first son of Roshan and Ira)
Hrithik Roshan (son of Rakesh)
 Rajesh Roshan (second son of Roshan and Ira)

Roy–Bhattacharya family
 Bimal Roy (director)
 Rinki Bhattacharya (writer, columnist and documentary filmmaker – daughter of Bimal Roy)
 Basu Bhattacharya (director – son-in-law of Bimal Roy)
 Aditya Bhattacharya (actor, director, screenwriter and producer – son of Basu Bhattacharya)
 Sanjana Kapoor (theatre personality and actress – ex-wife of Aditya Bhattacharya)

Roy–Joshi–Irani family
 Praveen Joshi (theater artist and director)
 Sarita Joshi (stage, television, film actress, wife of Praveen)
 Ketki Dave (actress, daughter of Sarita Joshi-Note:-Aa raa raa-Amdani Athanni)
 Purbi Joshi (TV and voice-dubbing actress – daughter of Sarita Joshi)
 Arvind Joshi (theatre artist, writer and brother of Praveen Joshi)
 Sharman Joshi (actor – son of Arvind Joshi and son-in-law of Prem Chopra)
 Manasi Joshi Roy (theater artist, daughter of Arvind joshi)
 Rohit Roy (actor, husband of Mansi Joshi Roy)
 Ronit Roy (actor, brother of Rohit Roy)
 Padmarani (sister of Sarita Joshi, Gujrathi and Hindi film actress)
 Daisy Irani (actress – daughter of Padmarani)
 Aruna Irani (paternal niece to Padmarani's husband, film and television actress)
 Sandesh Kohli (husband of Aruna Irani, director and writer)
 Adi Irani (brother of Aruna Irani)
 Indra Kumar (brother of Aruna Irani)
 Firoz Irani (brother of Aruna Irani)

Ratheesh family
 Ratheesh
 Parvathy Ratheesh (actress, daughter of Ratheesh)
 Padmaraj Ratheesh (actor, son of Ratheesh)

Rajda family
 Mulraj Rajda (writer, director and actor)
 Sameer Rajda (son of Mulraj and Indumati, actor)

S

Samanta family
 Shakti Samanta (director and producer)
 Ashim Samanta (director, producer, son of Shakti Samanta)

Sapru family
 Sapru (character actor)
 Tej Sapru (actor, son of Sapru)
 Priti Sapru (actress, daughter of Sapru)
 Reema Rakesh Nath (script writer, director, daughter of Sapru)
 Karan Nath (actor, son of Reema and Rakesh Nath)
 Vinay Sapru (Writer, Director and Producer in Hindi Film Industry)

Sen family
 Suchitra Sen
 Moonmoon Sen (daughter of Suchitra)
 Raima Sen a.k.a. Raima Dev Varma (elder daughter of Moonmoon)
 Riya Sen a.k.a. Riya Dev Varma (younger daughter of Moonmoon)

Sen family (of Chidananda Dasgupta)
 Chidananda Dasgupta (director)
 Aparna Sen (actor and director – daughter of Chidananda Dasgupta)
 Mukul Sharma (sports journalist – ex-husband of Aparna Sen)
 Konkona Sen Sharma (actress – daughter of Aparna)
 Ranvir Shorey (actor – ex-husband of Konkana)

Shetty family (of Suniel Shetty)
 Suniel Shetty (actor, producer and entrepreneur)
 Mana Shetty (entrepreneur and fashion designer – wife of Sunil Shetty)
 Athiya Shetty (actress – daughter of Sunil Shetty)
 K. L. Rahul (cricketer - husband of Athiya Shetty)
 Ahan Shetty (actor– son of Sunil Shetty)

Shetty family (of Shilpa Shetty)
 Shilpa Shetty (actress, producer, model and businesswoman)
 Raj Kundra (husband of Shilpa Shetty, businessman, producer)
 Shamita Shetty (actress – sister of Shilpa Shetty)
Shweta Shetty (singer – cousin of Shilpa Shetty and Shamita Shetty)

Shetty family (of MB Shetty)
M. B. Shetty worked as an action director and actor in Hindi and Kannada cinema. He had a towering personality with a bald head, often cast as the villain brought down by heroes half his size. Some of his memorable films include China Town, An Evening in Paris, Kismat, Lalkar, Aankhen, Don and Kalicharan.
His two sons Rohit Shetty and Hriday Shetty are well-known film directors. Rohit has directed films like Golmaal series, Singham series and Chennai Express. Whereas Hriday directed Plan and Pyaar Ka Twist.
 M. B. Shetty (action director and actor)
 Rohit Shetty (director, producer and cinematographer)
 Hriday Shetty (director)

Shroff family 
 Jackie Shroff (actor, film producer)
 Ayesha Dutt (former actress and model, current film producer)
 Tiger Shroff (actor – eldest son of Jackie Shroff)

Shantaram–Pendharkar–Talpade family

Shantaram and Bhalji Pendharkar are considered to be biggest names in Indian film Industry and also both of them were Dadasaheb Phalke Award recipients. Indian film personalities like Master Vinayak, Nanda, Siddharth Ray belongs to this family. Pandit Jasraj was son-in-law of Shantaram. Bollywood veterans like Jayashree T. also belong to this family.
 V. Shantaram (director, producer and actor)
 Sandhya Shantaram (actress, third wife of Shantaram)
 Kiran Shantaram (producer, son of Shantaram)
 Rajshree (actress, daughter of Shantaram)
 Pandit Jasraj (vocalist, son-in-law of Shantaram and belongs to Pandit family)
 Ranjana Deshmukh (actress, niece to Sandhya Shantaram)
 Durga Jasraj (daughter of Pandit Jasraj)
 Siddharth Ray (actor, grandson of Shantaram)
 Shantipriya (actress, wife of Siddharath Ray)
 Bhanupriya (actress, sister of Shantipriya)
 Bhalji Pendharkar (film maker, maternal cousin of Shantaram)
 Baburao Pendharkar (elder brother of Bhalji, famous film personality)
 Master Vinayak (actor, brother of Bhalji)
 Prabhakar Pendharkar (writer, son of Bhalji)
 Nanda (actress, daughter of vinayak)
 Jayshree T. (actress, sister-in-law of Nanda)
 Shreyas Talpade (actor, nephew of Jayashree and Radhika

Sinha family
 Shatrughan Sinha (actor and politician)
 Poonam Sinha (actress and producer)
 Luv Sinha (actor, son of Shatrughan and Poonam Sinha)
 Kush Sinha (actor, son of Shatrughan and Poonam Sinha)
 Sonakshi Sinha (actress, daughter of Shatrughan and Poonam Sinha)
 Bhavna Ruparel (actress, cousin of Luv, Kush and Sonakshi)
 Pooja Ruparel (actress, sister of Bhavna)

Sippy family
 G. P. Sippy (producer and director)
 Ramesh Sippy (director, son of G. P. Sippy)
 Kiran Juneja (actress, wife of Ramesh Sippy)
 Rohan Sippy (director, producer, son of Ramesh Sippy)

Suman family
 Shekhar Suman
 Adhyayan Suman

Sukumaran family
 Sukumaran (actor and producer, Mollywood character actor)
 Mallika Sukumaran (actress, wife of Sukumaran)
 Indrajith Sukumaran (actor, son of Sukumaran and Mallika Sukumaran)
 Poornima Indrajith (actress, fashion designer, Wife of Indrajith Sukumaran)
 Prarthana Indrajith (actress, playback singer, elder daughter of Indrajith and Poornima)
 Prithviraj Sukumaran (actor, director, producer, singer, second son of Sukumaran and Mallika Sukumaran)

Suresh Gopi family
 Suresh Gopi (actor)
 Gokul Suresh (actor, son of Suresh Gopi)

T

Tandon–Makijany family 
 Ravi Tandon (director and producer)
 Raveena Tandon (actress, model, producer – daughter of Ravi Tandon)
 Mac Mohan (actor – maternal uncle of Raveena Tandon)
 Manjari Makijany (writer, director, producer – daughter of Mac Mohan)

U

Uppalapati family
 Uppalapati Krishnam Raju (actor)
 Prabhas (actor, Krishnam Raju's nephew)

V

Varma family

Originating in the Punjab Province of India, six brothers, all sons of Laxmidas and Hakumdai Chawla, changed their last name to Varma after moving to Bombay to enter the movie industry. The six brothers produced and distributed Hindi films and their descendants continued this endeavor while making other contributions to the film industry as well.

See also 
 Hindi cinema content lists
 List of entertainment industry dynasties

References

Further reading

External links
 Dynasties scorch silver screen – The Times of India

Hindi film families
 
Hindi Film Clans
Film clans
Clans
Film